The Exchequer Standards may refer to the set of official English standards for weights and measures created by Queen Elizabeth I (English units), and in effect from 1588 to 1825, when the Imperial Units system took effect, or to the whole range of English unit standards maintained by the Court of the Exchequer from the 1200s, or to the physical reference standards physically kept at the Exchequer and used as the legal reference until the such responsibility was transferred in the 1860s, after the Imperial system had been established.

The Exchequer standards made in the reign of Queen Elizabeth were not authorized by any statute. The standards were ordered by the royal authority, as appears from a roll of Michaelas terms in the 29th Elizabeth, preserved in the Queen's Remembrancer's Office, and containing the royal proclamation.

The Exchequer Standards were so called because their repository had always been the Court of the King's Exchequer.

Notably, Elizabeth I's redefinition of these standards instituted the English Doubling System, whereby each larger liquid measure equals exactly two of the next-smaller measure.

Historical development

1225–1265 The Great Charter (9 Henry III.)

The Great Charter of 1225 was the first legislative act in the English statutes at large, and is a repetition of Magna Carta by Henry III in 1300, although it is officially listed as act 9 Henry III.

With respect to Magna Carta requiring that there be one unified measure of volume, and another for length, thus unifying disparate measurement systems used to trade each different commodity, there is an argument made that this supposition is in error, and that it actually required these remain separately defined measures, but each be consistent across the kingdom:

The Rumford corn gallon of 1228, examined by the committee of the House of Commons in 1758, was found to be 266.25 cubic inches.

Corn
The quarter of London

Ale
the Ale gallon: of the same contents for liquid measure as the half peck was for dry

Wine
One measure of wine was a gallon, not of the same cubical contents as the half-peck and ale gallon, but which, when filled with wine, was of the same weight as the half-peck, or corn gallon, when filled with wheat.

Cloth
One breadth of cloth: two yards (ulna) within the lists

1266–1304 (51 Henry III.) Assize of bread and or ale
According to Secretary Adams,

Adams goes on to say (paraphrased and simplified):
The act noted that thirty-two kernels of average wheat from the middle of the ear were equal in weight to the silver penny sterling, new from the mint, round and without clipping—22.5 Troy grains.
It then defined that twenty such pence equal an ounce.
It then defined that twelve ounces equal one pound (sterling?), which Mr. Adams stated was 5400 Troy grains.
It then defined that eight pounds (of fifteen ounces or 6,750 Troy grains; the commercial pound) equal a gallon of Gascoign wine, which was used to define the standard bushel. This wine was later called Claret or Bordeaux, and its specific gravity as compared with distilled water was 9,935 to 10,000, and weighed 250 troy grains per cubic inch. Mr. Adams continues his calculation to state that these eight pounds weighed 54,000 Troy grains, which divided by 250 gives a wine gallon of 216 cubic inches, which is very close to the Irish wine gallon (217.6 cubic inches) in effect in 1817. Yet when calculated based on the definition of the 63-gallon hogshead, Mr. Adams calculates the wine gallon to be 219.43 cubic inches.
It then defined that there are eight bushels in a quarter (by weight, not volume). So a bushel, filled with wheat, would exactly balance a keg containing eight gallons of wine, deducting the tare of both vessels.
Also, one eighth of this bushel, by volume, would be a vessel and called the ale gallon.

Thus, the key to the whole measurement system of 1266 was the weight of the silver penny sterling. This penny was 1/240th of the Tower pound, which had been used at the London mint for centuries before the Norman conquest, and which continued as legal tender until 1527, when Henry VIII replaced it with the Troy pound. The Tower pound weighed 3/4 Troy ounce less than the Troy pound (15/16th of the Troy pound). Its penny, therefore weighed 22.5 Troy grains.

There was also another pound used c. 1266; the commercial pound, which equaled fifteen ounces was used to measure wine and most other items of commerce.

1304–1494 (31 Edward I?)
At this point, there is not yet any mention of the avoirdupois or troy weights.

1494–1496 (10 Henry VII)
King Henry the Seventh had 43 copies of the Exchequer standards made and distributed to the principal cities of the kingdom, but these were later found to be defective, and remade in 1496.

1496– (12 Henry VII)
The 1496 statute redefined the volumetric measures based on the Troy weights, officially discarding (though perhaps not on purpose) the Tower pound and the commercial pound for defining all measures:

"The measure of a bushel contain eight gallons of wheat, that every gallon contain eight pounds of wheat, troy weight, and every pound contain twelve ounces of troy weight, and every ounce contain twenty sterlings, and every sterling be of the weight of thirty-two corns of wheat that grew in the midst of the ear of wheat, according to the old laws of the land."

Mr. Adams explains that this act of 1496 made several errors including inverting the order of the old statutes, assuming that the penny sterling, described in the acts of 1266 and 1304 was the penny weight troy (which it was not because the coinage had been adjusted since), and a belief that it was the measure, and not the weight, of eight gallons of wine, which constituted the bushel. It is here that the Guildhall gallon of 224 cubic inches is created. The same act creates the gallon of 231 cubic inches,

1428 2 Henry VI, c 2
King Henry the Sixth decreed the following, which adjusted the sizes of casks "in old time it was ordained, and lawfully used, that tuns, pipes, tertians, hogsheads, of Gascoigne wine, barrels of herring and of eels, and butts of salmon, coming by way of merchandise into the land, out of strange countries, and also made in the same land, should be of certain measure; that is to say: the tun of wine 252 gallons, the pipe 126 gallons, the tertian 84 gallons, the hogshead 63 gallons, the barrel of herring and of eels 30 gallons, fully packed, the butt of salmon 84 gallons, fully packed, &c.; but that of late, by device and subtlety, such vessels have been of much less measure, to the great deceit and loss of the king and his people, whereof special remedy was prayed in the parliament."

Competing systems
By 1862, there were multiple competing and confusing systems of measurement in the United Kingdom, and suggestions for simplification and possibly even switching to the French Metric system.

Systems of Length
inch
foot
yard
mile (English: 1,760 yards; Scotch: 1,977 yards; Irish: 2,240 yards)
Nautical
fathoms (man-of-war: 6 feet; merchant vessel: 5.5 feet; fishing smack: 5 feet)
knots
leagues
geographical mile: 1 1/7th mile
Surveyors' measures:
links
chains
rods
poles
perches

Systems of Area
land
acre (several in England, including Falmouth: 4,840 square yards; Preston: 10,240; elsewhere 9,000)
rood (several in England)
Scotch acre
Irish acre
Cloth
yards
nails
ells (4 different sorts)

Systems of Weight
Grains, computed cdecimally, used for scientific purposes.
Troy weight, under 5 Geo. 4. c. 74, and 18 & 19 Vict. c. 72.
Troy ounce, with decimal multiples and divisions, called bullion weights, under 16 & 17 Vict. c. 29.
Banker's weights, to weigh 10, 20, 30, 50, 100, and 200 sovereigns.
Apothecaries weight.
Diamond weights and pearl weights, including carats.
Avoirdupois weight, under 5 Geo. 4. c. 74, and 18 & 19 Vict. c. 72.
Weights for hay and straw.
Wool weight, using as factors 2, 3, 7, 13, and their multiples.
Coal weights, decimal, under 1 & 2 Will. 4. c. 76, and 8 & 9 Vict. c. 101, Nos. 1, .5, .2, .1, .05, .025.
stone (about 10 different definitions)
hundredweight (100lbs, 112lbs, or 120lbs)
pound (Dutch, troy, or avoirdupois)

Systems of Volume
Bushels (27 different ones, including 168 lbs., 73lbs., 80lbs., 60lbs., 70lbs., 63lbs, and so on)
Hoghead (ale: 54 gallons; wine: 63 gallons)
pipe of wine (port: 103 gallons; Teneriffe: 100 gallons; Madeira 92 gallons; Marsala 93 gallons)
cubic inches

Modifications
Addition of the Queen Anne Wine Gallon in 1707 (Act 5 Anne, cap. 27. s. 17.)

Definitions
23 Elizabeth c. 8 (1591)
35 Elizabeth c. 6 (1593)
35 Elizabeth c. 10. par. III (1593)

See also
English units
Winchester measure
Imperial units

References

External links
British Imperial System
CALICO TO WHISKEY: A CASE STUDY ON THE DEVELOPMENT OF THE DISTILLING INDUSTRY IN THE NAAS REVENUE COLLECTION DISTRICT, 1700-1921
Building With God
Medieval Economic Thought
Isn't a gallon, a gallon?

Imperial units
Standards organisations in the United Kingdom
Science in the Middle Ages
Obsolete units of measurement
Systems of units